Wittenheim is a commune in the Haut-Rhin department, Grand Est, northeastern France. It is one of the northern suburbs of the city of Mulhouse, and forms part of the Mulhouse Alsace Agglomération, the inter-communal local government body for the Mulhouse conurbation. The commune contains two mining villages, the Cité Jeune-Bois and the Cité Sainte-Barbe.

Population

See also
Communes of the Haut-Rhin department

References

Communes of Haut-Rhin
Haut-Rhin communes articles needing translation from French Wikipedia